The William C. Boydell House is a double house located at 4614 Cass Avenue in Midtown Detroit, Michigan. It was listed on the National Register of Historic Places in 1982.

History
William C. Boydell was born in 1849 in Staffordshire, England. His parents soon emigrated to London, Ontario, and five years later moved to Detroit, where Boydell attended school. In 1865 he began work as a clerk in the paint works of James H. Worcester. In 1867 William and his older brother John began their own firm, the Boydell Brothers White Lead and Color Company, with William as vice-president. The firm was owned by the Boydell family until 1959.

In 1895, William Boydell constructed this double house, designed by Almon Clother Varney as his home. He lived there until his death in 1902.

Architecture
The William C. Boydell House is a three-story brick and limestone Beaux-Arts double house with a hip roof, built to resemble a single-family home. The front façade is lined with a pair of rock-faced terraces, and the front of the two units are unified in appearance by a brick frieze running under the eaves and banded limestone at the first story.

See also 
 Lancaster and Waumbek Apartments: other buildings designed by Almon Clother Varney

References

Culture of Detroit
Houses on the National Register of Historic Places in Michigan
Houses completed in 1895
Houses in Detroit
Historic district contributing properties in Michigan
National Register of Historic Places in Detroit